This is a list of transactions that have taken place during the off-season and the 2018–19 WPBL season.

Front office movements

Head coach changes
Off-season

Player movement

Free agency

Going overseas

See also
2018–19 WPBL season
List of 2018–19 WPBL team rosters

References

External links
 WPBL Official Website (in Russian)

2018–19 in Russian basketball